Dorinda Fraser (1947-2010), was a female swimmer who competed for England.

Swimming career
She represented England and won a bronze medal in 110 yards breaststroke, at the 1962 British Empire and Commonwealth Games in Perth, Western Australia.

References

1947 births
2010 deaths
English female swimmers
Commonwealth Games bronze medallists for England
Swimmers at the 1962 British Empire and Commonwealth Games
Commonwealth Games medallists in swimming
Medallists at the 1962 British Empire and Commonwealth Games